Maxoom is the debut studio album by Canadian rock band Mahogany Rush, released in October 1972 in Canada and in 1973 in the United States. The group's frontman Frank Marino is credited as the writer of all songs and the album's producer. Songs "Buddy" and "All in Your Mind" were previously released as a single in May 1972.
The album's front cover includes part of the central panel from Hans Memling's painting The Last Judgment. The phrase Dedicated to Jimi Hendrix is printed at the back cover.

Track listing
All songs written by Frank Marino. Lengths according to the Nine Records vinyl label.

Personnel
All information according to the original vinyl back cover.

Mahogany Rush
Frank Marino - Guitar, Vocals
Paul Harwood - Fender Bass
James Ayoub - Drums, Percussion

Guest Musicians
Phil Bech - Piano on "Blues"
Johnny McDiarmid - Organ on "The New Beginning"

Production
Frank Marino - Production, Arrangement
Hubert Liesker - Recording Engineering
Yvon Caron - Mastering Engineering
Robert Nickford - Executive Production

Artwork
Bob Lemm - Album Design
Thomas Reti - Photography
Robert Lips - Photography
Hans Memling - Painting "The Last Judgment"

References

1972 debut albums
Mahogany Rush albums